Rodolfo Armando Ruiz II (born 1979) is a United States district judge of the United States District Court for the Southern District of Florida and former Florida state court judge.

Biography 

Ruiz received a Bachelor of Arts from Duke University. He earned his Juris Doctor in 2005 from the Georgetown University Law Center. He began his legal career as a law clerk to Judge Federico A. Moreno of the United States District Court for the Southern District of Florida.

Ruiz served as an Assistant County Attorney for the Miami-Dade County's Attorney's office. From 2012 to 2014 he served as a judge of the Miami-Dade County Court. Governor Rick Scott appointed him to the Eleventh Judicial Circuit Court in 2014 and he served in that capacity until his appointment to the federal bench in 2019.

Ruiz attended Ransom Everglades School in Miami, Florida, and played water polo on the 1997 state championship team.

Federal judicial service 

Ruiz was mentioned as a potential judicial nominee in February 2018. On April 26, 2018, President Donald Trump announced his intent to nominate Ruiz to serve as a United States District Judge of the United States District Court for the Southern District of Florida. On May 7, 2018, his nomination was sent to the Senate. He was nominated to the seat vacated by Judge William J. Zloch, who assumed senior status on January 31, 2017. On June 20, 2018, a hearing on his nomination was held before the Senate Judiciary Committee. On July 19, 2018, his nomination was reported out of committee by a voice vote.

On January 3, 2019, his nomination was returned to the President under Rule XXXI, Paragraph 6 of the United States Senate. On January 23, 2019, President Trump announced his intent to renominate Ruiz for a federal judgeship. His nomination was sent to the Senate later that day. On February 7, 2019, his nomination was reported out of committee by a voice vote. On May 1, 2019, the Senate invoked cloture on his nomination by a 89–10 vote. On May 2, 2019, his nomination was confirmed by a 90–8 vote. He received his judicial commission on May 3, 2019.

Memberships 

On his Senate Judiciary Committee questionnaire, Ruiz reported being a member of a number of bar associations and legal committees, including the American Bar Association, Federalist Society, and the Hispanic National Bar Association.

See also  
 List of Hispanic/Latino American jurists

References

External links 
 
 

|-

1979 births
Living people
21st-century American lawyers
21st-century American judges
Duke University alumni
Federalist Society members
Florida lawyers
Florida state court judges
Georgetown University Law Center alumni
Hispanic and Latino American judges
Judges of the United States District Court for the Southern District of Florida
Lawyers from Miami
State attorneys
United States district court judges appointed by Donald Trump
Latino conservatism in the United States